Clintonville Municipal Airport  is located two miles southeast of Clintonville, in Waupaca County, Wisconsin, United States. The Federal Aviation Administration (FAA) National Plan of Integrated Airport Systems for 2021–2025 categorized it as a local general aviation facility.

The airport was the birthplace of Wisconsin Central Airlines, which became North Central Airlines. It had scheduled flights to Clintonville from 1948 until 1966.

Facilities
The airport covers 533 acres (216 ha) at an elevation of 822 feet (251 m). It has three runways: 14/32 is 4,599 by 75 feet (1,402 x 23 m) asphalt; 4/22 is 3,812 by 75 feet (1,162 x 23 m) asphalt; 9/27 is 2,002 by 170 feet (610 x 52 m) grass.

In the year ending June 24, 2020 the airport had 11,500 aircraft operations, an average of 32 per day: 93% general aviation and 7% air taxi. In January 2023, there were 21 aircraft based at this airport: 20 single-engine and 1 multi-engine.

The CLINTONVILLE (CLI) non-directional beacon, 209 kHz, is on the field.

See also 
 List of airports in Wisconsin

References

External links 
 Airport page at City of Clintonville website
  at Wisconsin DOT Airport Directory
 

Airports in Wisconsin
Buildings and structures in Waupaca County, Wisconsin